FPK may refer to:
 Federal Party of Kenya
 Finsbury Park station, in London
 First People of the Kalahari
 Fitch H. Beach Airport, serving Charlotte, Michigan, United States
 Fokker–Planck–Kolmogorov equation, in physics and mathematics
 Fokofpolisiekar, an Afrikaner alternative music group
 Fox-Pitt Kelton Cochran Caronia Waller, an investment bank
 Free Pascal, an open source compiler
 Freedom Party in Carinthia (German: {[lang|de|Die Freiheitlichen in Kärnten}]), a political party in Caranthia, Austria
 PSL (rifle), a Romanian marksman rifle